Latisha Chan and Ivan Dodig were the defending champions and successfully defended their title, defeating Gabriela Dabrowski and Mate Pavić in a rematch of the 2018 final, 6–1, 7–6(7–5). becoming the first team in the Open era to win back-to-back French Open mixed doubles title.

Seeds

Draw

Finals

Top half

Bottom half

References

External links
 Main Draw
2019 French Open – Doubles draws and results at the International Tennis Federation

Mixed Doubles
French Open - Mixed Doubles
French Open - Mixed Doubles
French Open by year – Mixed doubles